Pourquoi Pas Music is a Taiwanese record label company established in 2018. The main operating mode of Pourquoi Pas Music is mainly through cooperation with artistes such as release of records and records management. Pourquoi Pas Music works with Diversity Music for the digital record release and management in mainland China.

Artists
Pourquoi Pas Music works with 13 artistes/groups currently (as of August 19, 2020).

Pourquoi Pas Music also works with 2 artistes management agencies too.

ICHI Entertainment
 Evan Yo (蔡旻佑)
 Greg Hsu (許光漢)
 Yoshua Tsai (阿膽)

forgood music
 Kowen Ko (柯智棠)
 Lumi Xu (許含光)
 Crispy Band (Crispy脆樂團)

References

External links 
 Official homepage

Taiwanese record labels
Record labels established in 2018
2018 establishments in Taiwan